Emo Speedway is a 3/8, high banked, dirt oval racetrack located in Emo, Ontario in Northwestern Ontario, Canada. It is located right inside the town on Colonization Road. Behind the racetrack is the Rainy River Valley Agricultural Society Fair Grounds. The track is located 30 km west of Fort Frances, and 52 km east of Rainy River along the border of Northern Minnesota, USA.

The speedway was built in 1954 and hosted its season opener on July 30 of the same year. The original name for the track was Emo Speedway (According to the Fort Frances Times), although the name Emo Raceway(s) was also used.

Currently, Emo Speedway runs three divisions (classes) of cars. They include WISSOTA Modifieds, WISSOTA Midwest Modifieds, and Street Stocks. The season runs from mid-May to mid-September.

The Borderland Racing Association (BRA) is the Promoting Body of Emo Speedway. The BRA is a non-profit organization that operates under volunteer support and monetary sponsorship.

The beginning
The idea of building a racetrack in the Rainy River District happened in 1949 after Lyle Busch and Bob Oak went to Florida to watch the stock car races there. When they brought the idea of a track back to the area, they were unable to find suitable land. In 1950, Asselin went to Winnipeg to discuss the building of a track with the owner of Brooklyn Speedway. After long conversations, the owner of the Winnipeg track gave Asselin his technical information. In May 1954, Sid Asselin and Bob Oak had meetings to organize a construction of the track with the District Fair Board. It was decided in those meetings that it was to be built inside the already built horse track which is approximately 1/2 mile long. With help from the Emo Chamber of Commerce, the track became a reality.

The track was built as a fifth of a mile oval dirt oval. The decision for using clay instead of paved asphalt was due to the softer compound. This allowed the track to be more advantageous for drivers and spectators. There would be a less chance of serious accidents and the loose dirt would allow more skidding which let the cars permit more bumping and nudging while fighting for position. The track was not banked, but the idea of raising the banking in the future was brought up.

The original organizing body for the Emo Speedway/Raceway was the Borderland Stock Car Racing Company (BSCRC) which was created by Sid Asselin and Bob Oak.

History

1950s
Stock Car Racing opened up at the Emo Speedway on Friday July 30, 1954. Thirteen competitors showed up for the first night and included drivers such as #8 Sid Asselin, #60 Don Marsh, #100 Maurice Frenette, #5 Lyle Busch, Bill Benniger, #37 Raoul Cayer, Tom Hardy and others.  Training had started the Sunday before and enough cars were ready by the 30th. A lighting system was built (The original blueprints have recently been discovered), and training took place under the lights during the week of the 23rd.

An estimated 2 500 spectators showed up to the first event (standing room only).

The races were featured for the first time at the Emo Fall Fair on August 14, 1954.

In 1955, the BSCRC was merged with the "International Driver's Club" (IDC).

The Emo Speedway continued racing until 1959, when diminishing crowds caused the IDC to run out of funds to continue.

It was $1.00 for Adults (Approx. $8 today) and .50 Cents for Kids (Approx. $4 today) for grandstand entrance.

1960s

The 1960s represented a golden age in racing. With the help of Glen Jackson and George Oltsher and others, the interest and support of racing in the community of Emo and surrounding area was on a large high during this period. The track had its reopening race in the summer of 1965.

Famous drivers such as #33 George Oltsher, Mel Jack, #1 Larry Jack, #38 Mike Andrusco, #25 Richard Visser, #7 Gary Reid, Gordie Lancaster, and Larry Long raced during this time.

1970s
The decade started out very well, still running off the great seasons of the 1960s. However, strife between the involved organizing bodies at Emo Raceway became a forefront in politics. People from one group wanted the rules and regulations a certain way, and a struggle between who should have control, organizing etc., occurred.

This led to a shutdown of the racetrack at the end of 1975. With the exception of a couple races during the Emo Fall Fair in the mid 70s, the track lay dormant from 1977 to 1982.

Drivers from this period were #6 Gary Wilson, #9 Ken Anderson and others.

1980s

In the winter of 1982/1983, a letter to the Editor was written to the Fort Frances Times regarding how missed the races were during the fair and that the races were the only real event that kept people coming back.

In response to this letter, Tom Jackson replied, saying that if there was enough support to start the races up again, he and others had no problem getting cars back on the track.

1983 was the first year of the return to racing at the track. Although it was not until 1986 when full seasons started, there were a couple of specials including the Fall Fair that were scheduled. Support was tremendous and some of the largest crowds ever seen at the track occurred during this time.

The Borderland Racing Association became incorporated in December 1985 and became the overseer of the Emo Speedway.  At the end of the 1989 season, the organization made the decision to join the WISSOTA Promoters' Association with their Modified class (Starting in 1990). This allowed a common set of rules for all tracks in the region permitting more traveling by local and regional drivers.

Drivers such as #34 Tom Jackson, #8N Brian Nelson, #21 Dwayne Pihulak, #27(#3K)Peter Leek, #14F Greg Ferris, #43 Darren Ward, #12 Dwayne Pelepetz, #2R Ricky Roche and #5 Wes Morriseau started racing during this time.

1990s

In Spring of 1993, the Emo Grandstand that stood for ninety-three years was taken down and replaced by an aluminum grandstand with the support of local clubs and organizations including the Borderland Racing Association. The race season was delayed until June due to construction, and a roof was added in 1994.

In September, a tragedy happened when #01 Keith McNally rolled over multiple times in his Thunder Stock on the first lap of the feature. He did not survive his injuries.  In remembrance, the Keith McNally Memorial was created to award the Street Stock driver who goes to the track consistently, works hard at racing, loves the sport, but unfortunately ends up towards the back. This was awarded to #4 Rick Bourre in 2008.

In 1994, Mini-Sprints were added to the regular schedule. The class had decent numbers for a first year schedule, with car counts as high as eight on most occasions. The class differed more to previous season classes by having a short wheelbase and wings for stability and down force.

In 1995, the Borderland Racing Association (BRA) changed hands to a private promoter named Sonny Ferris. Ferris, who had been the announcer, promoter, and track president for the past few years, decided the track might do better without a Board. Emo Speedway Inc. came into being, abolishing the BRA. However, decreasing car and fan counts in 1996 and 1997, led to Ferris quitting as private promoter. The Borderland Racing Association returned in 1998 with Ed Rea and others leading the new board of directors.

As quoted in the Fort Frances Times on March 18, 1998:

The race dates were also changed from Friday nights to Thursday nights to try increasing car and fan turnout. This, however, didn't work out well and race nights were subsequently changed in 1999 to Saturday.

The 1990s also saw the introduction of the Super Stock class and the Mini-Sprint class. The Super Stock class never caught on and counts remained low from 1995 to 1997, resulting in its drop. The Mini-Sprint class was unstable. The class increased and decreased on a week to week basis, but invitationals brought in a higher count of about 14 to 16 cars. But the Mini-Sprints fell to average only a few in 2004 and the class was dropped before the 2005 season.

Many invitationals ran during the 1990s, especially around the period of 1995 to 1997. Sonny Ferris hoped the larger payouts would draw in larger crowds and car counts. While car counts were larger because of the higher payouts during special events, fans seemed to get saturated by the sheer number of special events and as a result, regular nights saw decreasing numbers. As a result, large amounts of money were being offered, but little was returned for the track.

The 1990s saw drivers such as #15 Ron Westover, #18 Chris Shine, #16 Gavin Paull, #00 Steve Arpin, #18J Chad Jonson, #2X4 Ken Perry, #11 Anthony Visser and others started their racing careers during this time.

2000s

The success of the late 1990s began to return in the year 2000 since the reinstatement of the Borderland Racing Association. The beginning 2000 saw much of the success that had been taken  While low attendance from fans had traditionally occurred during the opening few races, 2000 saw more than average crowds. Although not highly noticeable, it seems that 2000 was a more successful year.

Invitationals were canceled for the 2001 season. This was mainly due to the fact that more money was being lost than earned, and the latest Modified Invitational that took place on June 30 and July 1 of 2000 saw only a few traveling cars, and less than satisfying fan counts. At the end of 2001, new clay was added in the corners of the Speedway.

2001 saw the talented Steve Arpin dominant the WISSOTA Modified class. It was in this year where his talents became fully known to the community. During the summer, he won 13 of the 15 races that took place. It was his second championship title in 3 years. His career in the Modifieds took off soon after and in 2003, Steve raced a more limited schedule in Emo and raced abroad. His last visit to Emo was during the NOPA Super Truck Special which took place on June 18, 2005. Arpin has raced in ARCA, NASCAR Nationwide Series, and in the Camping World Truck Series.

2004 saw the introduction of a new class. Midwest Modifieds were created to make a cheaper alternative for open wheel racing such as the Modifieds. This allowed the older motors and chassis' that were used on Modifieds during the 1990s to be raced again. During the year, the Borderland Racing Association ran Street Stocks, Modifieds, Midwest Modifieds, and Mini-Sprints.

2004 also saw the placement of a new lighting system for the racetrack. A dozen or so Mercury-vapour lights replaced the older halogen lights which had been in place since the early-1980s. It also featured underground wiring that required less poles, which in turn, allowed an increase in fan view ability. A new pit canteen was also built in that year.

2005 was a down and up season. Firstly, the season got off to a rough start as the opener was canceled due to rain and the first two weeks of June were also rained out. The weekend of June 17 brought the first real sunshine and blue skies. The first invitational to be scheduled since 2000 took place on June 18. NOPA Super Trucks from Winnipeg, Manitoba visited Emo Speedway for the first time. Seven trucks made the long trip and a higher than usual turnout was seen in the grandstand. The rest of the season turnout very well in terms of weather, with the exception of Friday night of the Fall Fair, when two inches of rain two days before and rain all day race day made for a mess.

2006 started out much better than in 2005 as the season opener on May 20 took place as scheduled. The BRA decided to include rain dates set for 1:00pm on Sunday if the races were canceled on the Saturday night. The season only saw one rain date used which was on Sunday, August 13. 2006 also saw the return of Super Stocks to Emo Speedway in almost a decade. The Special took place on July 22, 2006 with 15 cars traveling from Thunder Bay, Ontario, Winnipeg, Manitoba, Bemidji, Minnesota, and Ashland, Wisconsin. The winner was Gary Nelson Jr. out of Blackduck, MN.

The 2007 season started on May 19 with cloudy skies and a temperature of 10C (50F). An average crowd for an opener braved the cold temperatures to watch the action. 2007 was a wet then dry season. One week after cold temperatures, a full day of rain the following Saturday canceled the races. The following week the Modified feature was rained out. June 9 was also a complete rain out. June 16 had beautiful weather, the first of the year, but the weekend after saw the features rained out. Canada Day Celebrations on June 30 had a double whammy. The features from June 23 ran plus a full show!

The second half of the season had only on rain out (July 14) but from then on it was great. The Super Stock Special of 2007 saw 15 cars once again compete. The added bonus was that they were also competing in the first year of the Northern Super Stock Touring Series, Emo being the second race of the three race series. The winner was #20 Kevin Penner of Blumenort, Manitoba, Canada.

The Emo Fall Fair drew a huge crowd and a large car count. 27 WISSOTA Modifieds appeared for day one while 23 showed for day two. In the WISSOTA Midwest Modifieds, 19 cars entered on day one and 22 entered on Day 2. In the Street Stocks, 15 started on Friday, and 14 started on Saturday. It was great weather and an exciting two nights of racing.

2008 was a wet start. Although the track would run its first four races of the season, there was no racing for three weeks out of four in June. On July 19, the Northern Super Stock Touring Series was rained out halfway after a record total of 16 WISSOTA Super Stocks had arrived. The race was rescheduled for August 2 where only 7 cars returned. However, the Annual Fall Fair Specials had beautiful weather. But on August 23 and September 6, the races were cut short and canceled respectively.

In late September, 300 dump truck loads (3,500 yards) of clay were added to the track. A complete resurfacing was done to the track.

In 2009, the Emo Speedway celebrated its 55th Anniversary of the original opening of the track on July, 25th. A large crowd and over 125 drivers, past and present attended the event. The winners were Greg Ferris in the WISSOTA Modifieds, Brady Caul in the WISSOTA Midwest Modifieds, and Scott Messner in the Street Stocks.

2010 to present

Special events

Emo Fall Fair Special (Rea Memorial)
The Emo Fall Fair Special is a two-day event that takes place during the Rainy River Agricultural Fall Fair scheduled for the third week of August. The race dates are usually Friday and Saturday, with the exception of 2002 where it was Saturday Night and Sunday Afternoon, and in 1998 and 2000, being only one day.

It is a two-day points event. At the end of night two, drivers are awarded the Rea Memorial Trophy. Each class winner receives an award.

2020 Rea Memorial Champions

WISSOTA Modifieds - #48 Jerome Guyot (Fannystelle, Manitoba)
WISSOTA Midwest Modifieds - #44 Austin Hunter (Winnipeg, Manitoba)
Street Stocks - #15R Raice Westover (Fort Frances, Ontario)

2019 Rea Memorial Champions

WISSOTA Modifieds - #69 Justin Jones (Bemidji, Minnesota)
WISSOTA Midwest Modifieds - #621 Colin Chaschuck (Neebing, Ontario)
Street Stocks - #15R Raice Westover (Fort Frances, Ontario)

2018 Rea Memorial Champions

WISSOTA Modifieds - #10W Ward Imrie (Winnipeg, Manitoba)
WISSOTA Midwest Modifieds - #85 Jamie Davis (Fort Frances, Ontario)
Street Stocks - #55 Tylar Wilson (Fort Frances, Ontario)

2017 Rea Memorial Champions

WISSOTA Modifieds - #10W Ward Imrie (Winnipeg, Manitoba)
WISSOTA Midwest Modifieds - #85 Jamie Davis (Fort Frances, Ontario)
Street Stocks - #55 Tylar Wilson (Fort Frances, Ontario)

2016 Rea Memorial Champions

WISSOTA Modifieds - #16 Gavin Paul (Fort Frances, Ontario)
WISSOTA Midwest Modifieds - #2C Dan Tocheri (Thunder Bay, Ontario)
Street Stocks - #33 Kendal Gamsby (Atikokan, Ontario)

2015 Rea Memorial Champions

WISSOTA Modifieds - #01 Joey Galloway (Manor, Saskatchewan)
WISSOTA Midwest Modifieds - #3D Kevin Monteith (Thunder Bay, Ontario)
Street Stocks - #55 Tylar Wilson (Fort Frances, Ontario)

2014 Rea Memorial Champions

WISSOTA Modifieds - #69 Justin Jones (Bemidji, Minnesota)
WISSOTA Midwest Modifieds - #88 Paul Veert (Winnipeg, Manitoba)
Street Stocks - #55 Tylar Wilson (Fort Frances, Ontario)

2013 Rea Memorial Champions

WISSOTA Modifieds - #85 Jamie Davis (Devlin, Ontario)
WISSOTA Midwest Modifieds - #17 Christopher Leek (Emo, Ontario)
Street Stocks - #88W Cody Wall (Winkler, MB)

2012 Rea Memorial Champions

WISSOTA Modifieds - #85 Jamie Davis (Devlin, Ontario)
WISSOTA Midwest Modifieds - #50 Brady Caul (Fort Frances, Ontario)
Street Stocks - #85 Darryl Desserre (Dryden, Ontario)

2011 Rea Memorial Champions

WISSOTA Modifieds - #01 Joey Galloway (Manor, Saskatchewan)
WISSOTA Midwest Modifieds - #21D Matt DePiero (Fort Frances, Ontario)
Street Stocks - #18 Scott Messner (Bemidji, Minnesota)

2010 Rea Memorial Champions

WISSOTA Modifieds - #99 Glen Strachan (Emo, Ontario)
WISSOTA Midwest Modifieds - #224 Cody Wolkowski (Thunder Bay, Ontario)
Street Stocks - #15 Ron Westover (Emo, Ontario)

2009 Rea Memorial Champions*

WISSOTA Modifieds - #85 Jamie Davis (Devlin, Ontario)
WISSOTA Midwest Modifieds - #99C Tridell Champlin (Deer River, Minnesota)
Street Stocks - #18M Scott Messner (Bemidji, Minnesota)

*Only one night was run, Night two was cancelled due to rain

2008 Rea Memorial Champions

WISSOTA Modifieds - #9EH Jason Anderson (Fort Frances, Ontario)
WISSOTA Midwest Modifieds - #3D Kevin Monteith (Thunder Bay, Ontario)
Street Stocks - #18X Scott Messner (Bemidji, Minnesota)

2007 Rea Memorial Champions

WISSOTA Modifieds - #9EH Jason Anderson (Fort Frances, Ontario)
WISSOTA Midwest Modifieds - #61 Tom Smart (Thunder Bay, Ontario)
Street Stocks - #47 Don Craig (Thunder Bay, Ontario)

2006 Rea Memorial Champions

WISSOTA Modifieds - #18J Chad Jonson (International Falls, Minnesota)
WISSOTA Midwest Modifieds - #00 Chuck Arpin (Crozier, Ontario)
Street Stocks - #15 Ron Westover (Devlin, Ontario)

Keith McNally Memorial Invitational

The Keith McNally Memorial was an invitational for Street Stock drivers which usually took place in September, the month in which McNally died. The Memorial race had its final run in 2014.

2014's winner was #55 Tylar Wilson
2013's winner was #500 Tylar Wilson
2012's winner was #15 Ron Westover
2011's winner was #15 Ron Westover
2010's winner was #20 Daniel Hettinga
2009's winner was #18M Scott Messner
2008's winner was undetermined due to inclement weather
2007's winner was #15 Ron Westover
2006's winner was #21B John Bosma

Canada Day

The Township of Emo and the Borderland Racing Association join together to celebrate Canada Day at the races. Cake is served during the event with fireworks after the races.

Mid-Season Summer Shootout

Started in 2005, the Annual Mid-Season Summer Shootout (Mid-Season Championship) sees bonus money awarded to the drivers in each class and also a trophy for the winner of each class in the feature event. The event has been rain delayed once, On July 14, 2007. It was rescheduled in August with the title sponsor of Piston Ring, and cancelled once on July 6, 2013.

2015 Winners

WISSOTA Midwest Modifieds #14C Cody Ossachuk (Pinewood, Ontario)
Street Stocks #55 Tylar Wilson (Fort Frances, Ontario)
WISSOTA Modifieds #4 Greg Ferris (Finland, Ontario)

2014 Winners

WISSOTA Midwest Modifieds #21D Matt Depiero (Fort Frances, Ontario)
Street Stocks #33 Kendal Gamsby (Stratton, Ontario)
WISSOTA Modifieds #16 Gavin Paull (Fort Frances, Ontario)

2012 Winners

WISSOTA Midwest Modifieds #60X Chuck Lambert (Fort Frances, Ontario)
Street Stocks #7 Darien Trimble (Fort Frances, Ontario)
WISSOTA Modifieds #1L Brad Loveday (Fort Frances, Ontario)

2011 Winners

WISSOTA Midwest Modifieds #50 Brady Caul (Fort Frances, Ontario)
Street Stocks #4U Lindsay Bourre (Rainy River, Ontario)
WISSOTA Modifieds #16 Gavin Paull (Fort Frances, Ontario)

2010 Winners

WISSOTA Midwest Modifieds #19 John Hettinga (Emo, Ontario)
Street Stocks #38 Don Bowman (Bemidji, Minnesota)
WISSOTA Modifieds #16 Gavin Paull (Fort Frances, Ontario)

2009 Winners

WISSOTA Midwest Modifieds #50 Brady Caul (Fort Frances, Ontario)
Street Stocks #18M Scott Messner (Bemidji, Minnesota)
WISSOTA Modifieds #99 Glen Strachan (Emo, Ontario)

2008 Winners

WISSOTA Midwest Modifieds #21P Dwayne Pihulak (Crozier, Ontario)
Street Stocks #500 Ron Westover/Tylar Wilson (Devlin, Ontario)
WISSOTA Modifieds #16 Gavin Paull (Fort Frances, Ontario)

Super Stock Specials

2012 #70K Rick Simpson (Thunder Bay, Ontario)
2008 #66 Rick Simpson (Thunder Bay, Ontario) *Part of NSSTS
2007 #20 Kevin Penner (Blumenort, Manitoba) *Part of NSSTS
2006 #74 Gary Nelson Jr. (Blackduck, Minnesota)

Winnipeg Super Trucks
2011 #25 Eric Guyot (Fannystalle, Manitoba) 
2010 #2 Ward Imrie (Winnipeg, Manitoba)
2005 #7 Ricky Weiss (Winnipeg, Manitoba)

Championships

Drivers are awarded points from showing, racing in a heat race and the feature. These points go toward a championship which is completed in the last week of August.

2020 Track Champions (Only 5 nights were raced due to COVID-19)
WISSOTA Midwest Modifieds #33c Cole Chernosky (Thunder Bay, Ontario)
WISSOTA Modifieds #48 Jerome Guyot (Fannystalle, Manitoba)
Street Stocks #96w Darren Wolframe (Thunder Bay, Ontario)

2019 Track Champions
WISSOTA Midwest Modifieds #14C Cody Ossachuk (Pinewood, Ontario)
WISSOTA Modifieds #99 Brody Strachan (Emo, Ontario)
Street Stocks #15R Raice Westover (Fort Frances, Ontario)

2018 Track Champions
WISSOTA Midwest Modifieds #14C Cody Ossachuk (Pinewood, Ontario)
WISSOTA Modifieds #99 Brody Strachan (Emo, Ontario)
Street Stocks #55 Tylar Wilson (Fort Frances, Ontario)

2017 Track Champions
WISSOTA Midwest Modifieds #14C Cody Ossachuk (Pinewood, Ontario)
WISSOTA Modifieds #99 Brody Strachan (Emo, Ontario)
Street Stocks #86 Kevin Desserre (Dryden, Ontario)

2016 Track Champions
WISSOTA Midwest Modifieds #14C Cody Ossachuk (Pinewood, Ontario)
WISSOTA Modifieds #99 Brody Strachan (Emo, Ontario)
Street Stocks #54X A.J Kellar (Fort Frances, Ontario)

2015 Track Champions
WISSOTA Midwest Modifieds #14C Cody Ossachuk (Pinewood, Ontario)
WISSOTA Modifieds #85D Jeff Davis (Devlin, Ontario)
Street Stocks #55 Tylar Wilson (Fort Frances, Ontario)

2014 Track Champions
WISSOTA Midwest Modifieds #17 Christopher Leek (Emo, Ontario)
WISSOTA Modifieds #4 Steve Nordin(Stratton, Ontario)
Street Stocks #33 Kendal Gamsby (Fort Frances, Ontario)

2013 Track Champions
WISSOTA Midwest Modifieds #17 Christopher Leek (Emo, Ontario)
WISSOTA Modifieds #16 Gavin Paull (Fort Frances, Ontario)
Street Stocks #15 Ron Westover (Fort Frances, Ontario)

2012 Track Champions
WISSOTA Midwest Modifieds #17 Christopher Leek (Emo, Ontario)
WISSOTA Modifieds #16 Gavin Paull (Fort Frances, Ontario)
Street Stocks #500 Libby Wilson (Fort Frances, Ontario)

2011 Track Champions
WISSOTA Midwest Modifieds #17 Christopher Leek (Emo, Ontario)
WISSOTA Modifieds #16 Gavin Paull (Fort Frances, Ontario)
Street Stocks #38 Don Bowman (Bemidji, Minnesota)

2010 Track Champions
WISSOTA Midwest Modifieds #50 Brady Caul (Fort Frances, Ontario)
WISSOTA Modifieds #99 Glen Strachan (Emo, Ontario)
Street Stocks #15 Ron Westover (Devlin, Ontario)

For a full list of Track Champions see Emo Speedway Championships

References

External links
The Official Website of the Emo Speedway
Official Newspaper of the Emo Speedway
Northern Super Stock Touring Series
Township of Emo

Motorsport venues in Ontario
Dirt oval racing venues in Canada
Buildings and structures in Rainy River District